Talgram is a town and a nagar panchayat in Kannauj district in the Indian state of Uttar Pradesh.

Geography
It has an average elevation of 147 metres (482 feet).

Demographics
 India census, Talgram had a population of 10,360. Males constitute 53% of the population and females 47%. Talgram has an average literacy rate of 46%, lower than the national average of 59.5%: male literacy is 53%, and female literacy is 37%. In Talgram, 19% of the population is under 6 years of age. This is one of the biggest towns in terms of population situated in Kannauj district.
Talgram is a nagar panchayat that is located in the district of Kannauj in Uttar Pradesh state of India. It comes in the Kanpur division. It is a tehsil headquarter and is located 31 km west from the district headquarters of Kannauj. The nearby villages to Talgram are Atrauli (4 km), Mundala (3 km), Narmau (3 km), Gadnapur Kazi (3 km), Jaramau Almapur (3 km). The people of Talgram primarily make their living through agriculture, cottage industry and other small scale industries. To a large extent, they are also dependent on natural and human forces. Ganga Charan Verma is one of the prominent business houses of Talgram.

References

Cities and towns in Kannauj district